The men's triple jump event at the 2004 World Junior Championships in Athletics was held in Grosseto, Italy, at Stadio Olimpico Carlo Zecchini on 16 and 18 July.

Medalists

Results

Final
18 July

Qualifications
16 July

Group A

Group B

Participation
According to an unofficial count, 31 athletes from 23 countries participated in the event.

References

Triple jump
Triple jump at the World Athletics U20 Championships